The Cataract River is a  river in Newton Township, Mackinac County in the Upper Peninsula of the U.S. state of Michigan.

References

Rivers of Michigan
Tributaries of Lake Michigan
Rivers of Mackinac County, Michigan